= Triplet, Virginia =

Unincorporated community in Virginia, United States

Coordinates: 36°36′38″N 77°45′57″W

Triplet is an unincorporated community located in Brunswick County, in the U.S. state of Virginia.
